Ash Wednesday is a 1925 German silent drama film directed by Wolfgang Neff and starring Bernd Aldor, Sybill Morel, and Claire Rommer.

The film's sets were designed by Fritz Kraenke.

Cast

References

Bibliography

External links

1925 films
1925 drama films
German drama films
Films of the Weimar Republic
Films directed by Wolfgang Neff
German silent feature films
German black-and-white films
Silent drama films
1920s German films